Urmas Vadi (born 28 February 1977) is an Estonian writer, scenarist, radio editor and personality, journalist and theatre director.

In 2002 he graduated from Tallinn University in radio directing speciality. Since 2001 he is working as a culture and literary editor at Estonian Radio.

Awards:
 2010: Annual Drama Award of the Estonian Cultural Endowment
 2011: Friedebert Tuglas short story award

Works
 "Kui klosetist kerkib kloaak" (1996)
 "Suur sekund" (1999)
 "Lendav laev" (2000)
 "Unetute ralli" (2002)
 "Muna" (2002)
 "Kohtume trompetis! Elvis oli kapis!" (2005)
 "Kohtumine tundmatuga" (2008)
 "Revident" (2009)
 "Kirjad tädi Annele" (2010)
 "Tagasi Eestisse" (2012)
 "Kuidas me kõik reas niimoodi läheme" (2014)
 "Neverland" (2017)
 "Ballettmeister" (2019)
 "Elu mõttetusest" (2019)

References

Living people
1977 births
20th-century Estonian writers
21st-century Estonian writers
Estonian male poets
Estonian male short story writers
Estonian dramatists and playwrights
Estonian screenwriters
Estonian theatre directors
Estonian journalists
Estonian radio personalities
Tallinn University alumni
Writers from Tallinn
People from Tallinn